Michelle den Dekker , also known as Michelle Fielke, is an Australian netballer from South Australia. den Dekker represented Australia in 84 tests between 1988 and 1995, including a record 71 as captain. She received the Medal of the Order of Australia (OAM) in 1992.

Netball career
Life member of the Garville Netball Club from 1989 to 1995 and helping the club clinch five premierships in 1989, 1991, 1992, 1994 and 1995. In the national league, den Dekker was captain-coach of the Queensland Firebirds in 1997-98 before returning home to the now defunct Adelaide Ravens.

den Dekker made her Australian debut in 1985, and led Australian to two world championships as captain (1991 and 1995). Michelle played a total of 84 test matches for Australia between 1985 and 1995, including 71 as captain. As captain her team enjoyed a win loss ratio of 92% (65 wins, 6 losses).

den Dekker was voted as Adelaide's greatest netballer to have fronted for the Adelaide Thunderbirds or Adelaide Ravens. She was inducted into the Australian Netball Hall of Fame in 2009.

Coaching career 
den Dekker OAM was appointed Head Coach of Netball Australia’s new Centre of Excellence in Canberra in April 2014.

den Dekker was the Diamonds Assistant coach for the Australian Netball Diamonds until August 2015 (the 2015 Netball World Cup). Currently still works as a consultant for Netball Australia as a Defence Specialist coach and manages her own Netball consultancy business working to develop our next generation of players and coaches in South Australia

Awards
 Medal of the Order of Australia (OAM) in 1992 
  SA Great Award, for services to sport in South Australia in 1993.
 Inducted into the Australian Netball Hall of Fame 2009
 Inducted into the Inaugural South Australian Hall Of Fame 2010
 Ambassador for the SA Sports Hall Of Fame alongside Legend Barrie Robran AM.
 Inducted into Sport Australia Hall of Fame in 2020.

References

External sources
 Michelle de Dekker
 Netball Australia

Living people
1966 births
Australia international netball players
Netball players at the 1989 World Games
Netball players at the 1993 World Games
Netball players at the 1985 World Games
Australian netball coaches
Adelaide Thunderbirds coaches
Queensland Firebirds players
Netball players from South Australia
Australian Institute of Sport netball coaches
Adelaide Ravens players
ANZ Championship coaches
Contax Netball Club players
Garville Netball Club players
Esso/Mobil Superleague players
South Australia state netball league players
Sport Australia Hall of Fame inductees
1991 World Netball Championships players
1995 World Netball Championships players